Thomas Gustav Rosenmeyer (April 3, 1920 – February 6, 2007) was a German-American classical scholar. He was a Professor Emeritus for Classics and Comparative Literature at the University of California, Berkeley. His main interest was the literature of classical Greece, especially Plato.

Biography
Rosenmeyer was born on April 3, 1920, in Hamburg and attended the Gelehrtenschule des Johanneums from 1930 to 1938. He left Germany for England in 1939, and was interned for being a German citizen and transferred to Canada, where Martin Ostwald and Emil Fackenheim were in the same camp. After being released in 1942, he graduated from McMaster University in 1944, completing his M.A. at the University of Toronto in 1945 and Ph.D. at Harvard in 1949. He was a faculty member at the University of Iowa, Smith College and the University of Washington before he went to the University of California, Berkeley.

Rosenmeyer was elected to the American Academy of Arts and Sciences in 1987 and the American Philosophical Society in 2000.

He died of cardiac arrest at his home in Oakland on February 6, 2007.

External links

References

1920 births
2007 deaths
German classical scholars
McMaster University alumni
University of Toronto alumni
University of Iowa faculty
Smith College alumni
University of Washington faculty
University of California, Berkeley faculty
Writers from Hamburg
People educated at the Gelehrtenschule des Johanneums
Harvard University alumni
German emigrants to Canada
Canadian emigrants to the United States

Members of the American Philosophical Society